DWSI (864 AM) Sonshine Radio is a radio station owned and operated by Sonshine Media Network International. The station's studio and transmitter are located at the 2nd Floor, Sarangaya Bldg., Brgy. Sinsayon, Santiago, Isabela.

On the morning of June 24, 2001, DWSI's studio was shot at by unidentified men.

References

Radio stations in Isabela (province)
Radio stations established in 1967